Kusumom Joseph (13 April 1926 – 14 December 1991) was an Indian politician. She represented Karikkode constituency in the first and second Kerala legislative assemblies. Kusumom entered in politics in 1948 through Indian National Congress. In 1952 she became the vice president of Congress Women's Wing, Muvattupuzha. She was also the state women's front Vice-President.

References

1926 births
1981 deaths
Kerala politicians